The Vongkusolkit family is a Sino-Thai business family. It does business in the sugar, coal and hospitality industries through its major holdings Mitr Phol, Banpu and The Erawan Group. The family, headed by Isara Vongkusolkit, is ranked by Forbes as the 24th richest in Thailand as of 2021.

References

Thai Chinese families
Business families of Thailand